WYNW (92.9 FM) is a radio station broadcasting a religious format. Licensed to Birnamwood, Wisconsin, United States, the station is owned by Relevant Radio, Inc. and features programming from Relevant Radio.

References

External links
 
 

YNW
Relevant Radio stations